Bevata is a town and commune in Madagascar. It belongs to the district of Vangaindrano, which is a part of Atsimo-Atsinanana Region. The population of the commune was estimated to be approximately 11,000 in 2001 commune census.

Only primary schooling is available. It is also a site of industrial-scale  mining. The majority 94% of the population of the commune are farmers, while an additional 1% receives their livelihood from raising livestock. The most important crops are rice and coffee, while other important agricultural products are bananas, cassava and pepper. Industry and services provide employment for 1% and 4% of the population, respectively.

References and notes 

Populated places in Atsimo-Atsinanana